Robert Lee Garner (September 26, 1934 – June 25, 1990) was an American football player who played with the Los Angeles Chargers and Oakland Raiders. He played college football at California State University, Fresno. His hometown was Hanford, California.

References

1934 births
1990 deaths
American football defensive backs
Fresno State Bulldogs football players
Los Angeles Chargers players
Oakland Raiders players
Players of American football from Long Beach, California
American Football League players